Acrocercops nereis is a moth of the family Gracillariidae. It is known in Australia from the states of New South Wales, Queensland and South Australia.

References

nereis
Moths of Australia
Moths described in 1880